Trees hold a particular role in Germanic paganism and Germanic mythology, both as individuals (sacred trees) and in groups (sacred groves). The central role of trees in Germanic religion is noted in the earliest written reports about the Germanic peoples, with the Roman historian Tacitus stating that Germanic cult practices took place exclusively in groves rather than temples. Scholars consider that reverence for and rites performed at individual trees are derived from the mythological role of the world tree, Yggdrasil; onomastic and some historical evidence also connects individual deities to both groves and individual trees. After Christianisation, trees continue to play a significant role in the folk beliefs of the Germanic peoples.

Terminology
The pagan Germanic peoples referred to holy places by a variety of terms and many of these terms variously referred to stones, groves, and temple structures. From Proto-Germanic , a masculine noun, developed Old Norse  meaning 'temple, idol', Old English  'temple, idol', and Old High German  meaning 'holy grove, holy stone'. According to philologist Vladimir Orel, the term was borrowed from the continental Celtic * or, alternately, the same non-Indo-European source as the Celtic source. A more general term for a sacred place was  reflected in Old Norse vé.

The Proto-Germanic masculine noun , which developed into Old Frankish  ('holy grove'), similarly either developed from, or is otherwise connected to, Gaulish , Latin  and Old Irish  'holiness'.

Attestations and archaeological record
Sacred trees and groves are widely attested among the records of the ancient Germanic peoples. Some scholars hypothesize that they even predated the development of temples (according to Rudolf Simek, "there were sacred woods long before there were temples and altars").

In his Germania, Tacitus says that the Germanic peoples "consecrate woods and groves and they apply the name of gods to that mysterious presence which they see only with the eye of devotion", Tacitus describes the grove of the Semnones and refers to a castum nemus ('chaste grove') in which the image of the goddess Nerthus was hallowed, and other reports from the Roman period also refer to rites held by continental Germanic peoples in groves, including the sacrifices in forest clearings of survivors by the Cherusci after their victory at the Battle of the Teutoburg Forest, recounted by Tacitus in his Annals based on a report by Germanicus. Such groves were sometimes dedicated to a particular deity: in addition to the case of Nerthus, there was a silva Herculi sacra ('wood sacred to Hercules', an interpretatio romana) near the River Weser, and the Semnones reportedly held their rituals in honor of the regnator omnium deus ('god the ruler of all'). The scholar of Germanic religion Jan de Vries noted that placenames such as Frølund (Denmark), and Ullunda, Frösvi, and Mjärdevi (Sweden), in which the name of a deity is compounded with words meaning "grove" or "wood", suggest a continuation of the same practice, but are found almost exclusively in eastern Scandinavia; however, there is a Caill Tomair recorded near Dublin, an oak forest apparently sacred to Thor.

Reverence for individual trees among the Germanic peoples is a common theme in medieval Christian denunciations of backsliding into paganism. In some cases, such as Donar's Oak (according to legend, felled by Christian missionary Saint Boniface), these were associated with particular gods, and the association of individual trees with saints can be seen as a continuation of the tradition into modern times.

The Landnámabók, which describes the settlement of Iceland and dates from the 13th century, tells of a skáld by the name of Þórir snepill Ketilsson who, after his crew encountered and fended off raiding vikings, arrived in Iceland and founded a sacred grove there:
...Thorir took possession of all of the whole of Fnjoskadale, as far as Odeila. He made his home at Lund [Old Norse 'grove'], and held the grove sacred.

Sacred trees and groves leave few archaeological traces, but two such sites may have been identified, both in Sweden. A mouldering birch stump surrounded by animal bones, especially from brown bear and pig, was discovered under the church on Frösön in Jämtland in 1984. The finds have been carbon dated to the late Viking Age. Possible burnt offerings have been found on a hill at Lunda near Strängnäs in Södermanland; the archeologist Gunnar Andersson has argued that the combination of the finds and the placename—which can mean "the grove"—point to this being the remnants of a sacrificial grove. Scholars have proposed that publicly revered trees such as that at the temple in Uppsala were regarded as counterparts to the mythic world tree Yggdrasil.

Notable examples
The present section divides particularly notable examples into texts discussing the religious activities of the ancient Germanic peoples involving trees and groves (Germanic paganism) and their appearance in the myths of the Germanic peoples, particularly the North Germanic peoples (Germanic mythology).

Germanic paganism
Sacred trees and groves are mentioned throughout the history of the ancient Germanic peoples, from their earliest attestations among Roman scribes to references made by medieval Christian monks. Notable examples of sacred trees and groves in the historical record among the ancient Germanic peoples include the following:

Germanic mythology
In Norse mythology, the northernmost extension of Germanic mythology, several sacred trees are mentioned. The most prominent of these trees is the holy tree central to the cosmos, Yggdrasil. Prominent trees mentioned in Germanic mythology include the following:

Post-Christianisation
After the nominal Christianisation of Anglo-Saxons and Saxons in the 7th and 8th centuries, many Heathen practices centered on trees such as worship and giving of gifts were made punishable crimes. Despite this, 11th century accounts describe the continuation of votive offering deposition at trees in England and worship in groves in Saxony. English Penitential laws made in the 11th century explicitly forbid the use of a friðplott or friðgeard - a peaceful area around stones, trees or springs.

In later folklore, offerings are made to tree spirits such as Askafroa in Scandinavia and Germany, and the Women of One Tree Hill in England. In the latter case, gifts to the trees are explicitly linked with a returned gift of increased land fertility. There exists also a Scandinavian folk tradition of farmers making small offerings to a "warden tree", regarded as exercising a protective function over the family and land.

See also
 Anthropomorphic wooden cult figurines of Central and Northern Europe, wooden cult images created by the Germanic peoples
 Ask and Embla, the first human beings in Norse mythology, created from trees and whose names may mean "ash" and "elm"
 Dream of the Rood, an Old English poem describing the crucifixion of Jesus from the point of view of a sentient tree
 Hlín, a Norse goddess whose name some scholars have suggested may mean 'maple tree'
 Ilmr, an Old Norse goddess whose name may mean 'elm'

Notes

References

 Andersson, Gunnar. 2006. "Among trees, bones, and stones: The sacred grove at Lunda" in Andrén, Anders, Kristina Jennbert, and Catharina Raudvere. Old Norse Religion in Long-Term Perspectives: Origins, Changes, and Interactions. Nordic Academic Press. 
 Birley, A. R. 1999. Trans. Tacitus, Germania. Oxford University Press. 
 Hacken, Richard. 2022. Worship of the German Forest: An Historical Overview. Academia Letters.
 Hermann Pálsson. 2006 [1972]. Landnámabók: The Book of Settlements. University of Manitoba Press. 
 Magnell, Ola; Iregren, Elisabeth. 2010. "Veitstu Hvé Blóta Skal : The Old Norse Blót in the Light of Osteological Remains from Frösö Church, Jämtland, Sweden". Current Swedish Archaeology. 18. Nordic Academic Press. 
 Orel, Vladimir. 2003. A Handbook of Germanic Etymology. Brill. 
 Ringe, Donald. 2006. From Proto-Indo-European to Proto-Germanic: A Linguistic History of English, 1. Oxford University Press. 
 Simek, Rudolf. 2007. Translated by Angela Hall. Dictionary of Northern Mythology. D.S. Brewer. 
 De Vries, Jan. 1970. Altgermanische Religionsgeschichte. Vol. 1. Grundriss der germanischen Philologie 12/I. 3rd ed (repr. 2nd ed [1956]). De Gruyter. .

Further reading
 Palm, Thede (1948). Trädkult: Studier i germansk religionshistoria. Skrifter utgivna av Vetenskaps-societeten i Lund, 33. Gleerup. . 

Trees in Germanic paganism
Trees in Germanic mythology
Sacred groves